Lescun is a village and a commune in the Pyrénées-Atlantiques department in south-western France.

Lescun is situated on the GR 10 long-distance footpath traversing the Pyrenees. Combined with the dramatic scenery of its mountain backdrop, this makes it a popular focus for hikers and climbers. Several lakes and summits can for example be reached from Lescun, including the lake of Lhurs, the lake of Ansabère, the Billare, the Pic d'Anie, and the Grande Aiguille d'Ansabère.

With its old buildings and narrow streets, Lescun exudes a pleasant old village charm.

Lescun in popular culture

Lescun the setting for the book Waiting for Anya by Michael Morpurgo.

See also
 Another distant picture
 Communes of the Pyrénées-Atlantiques department

References

External links

 Lescun panorama

Communes of Pyrénées-Atlantiques
Pyrénées-Atlantiques communes articles needing translation from French Wikipedia